Creed is a 2015 American sports drama film directed by Ryan Coogler, who co-wrote the screenplay with Aaron Covington. It is the first spin-off of and is the seventh installment in the Rocky film series. It stars Michael B. Jordan, Sylvester Stallone, Tessa Thompson, Phylicia Rashad, Tony Bellew, and Graham McTavish. In the film, amateur boxer Adonis Creed (Jordan) is trained and mentored by Rocky Balboa (Stallone), the former rival turned friend of Adonis' father, Apollo Creed.

Although Rocky Balboa (2006) was considered the end of the franchise, Metro-Goldwyn-Mayer hired Coogler in 2013 to develop a Rocky spin-off. Coogler and Covington's original screenplay was completed by April 2014, with the involvement of Jordan and Stallone also confirmed. The remaining cast were hired by January 2015, after which, principal photography began and lasted until that April, with filming locations including Liverpool, Philadelphia, and Gainesville.

Creed had its premiere on November 19, 2015, at the Regency Village Theater in Los Angeles and was released in the United States on November 25, by Warner Bros. Pictures, to coincide with the 40th anniversary of the date of the opening scene in the first film. It grossed $173 million worldwide and received universal acclaim from critics who praised Coogler's direction, the screenplay, and acting performances. Among its accolades, it was selected by National Board of Review as one of the top ten films of 2015, while Stallone won the National Board of Review Award for Best Supporting Actor, the Critics' Choice Award for Best Supporting Actor, and Golden Globe Award for Best Supporting Actor in a Motion Picture, and was nominated for the Academy Award for Best Supporting Actor. The film was followed by Creed II (2018) and Creed III (2023).

Plot

In 1998, Adonis "Donnie" Johnson -- the son of former heavyweight champion Apollo Creed via an extramarital affair -- is serving time in a Los Angeles youth detention center when Creed's widow, Mary Anne, visits and offers to take him in.
In 2015, Donnie is in Tijuana, preparing for his fight in an amateur boxing bout hosted in a bar. Upon returning from his latest fight, Donnie resigns from the Smith Boardley Financial Group to pursue his dream of becoming a professional boxer. Donnie auditions at Los Angeles' elite Delphi Boxing Academy, managed by family friend Tony "Little Duke" Evers Jr., the son of Apollo's trainer Tony "Duke" Evers, but is turned down. This rejection is further emphasized as Donnie is beaten in a sparring match by light heavyweight division #2 contender Danny "The Stuntman" Wheeler after he publicly challenges the whole gym to prove himself, betting his 1967 Ford Mustang that no one can get a clean head shot on him. Mary Anne vehemently opposes his aspirations, remembering how her husband was killed in the ring by Ivan Drago thirty years ago. Undaunted, Donnie travels to Philadelphia in hopes of getting in touch with his father's old friend and rival, former heavyweight champion, Rocky Balboa.

Donnie meets Rocky at Rocky's Italian restaurant, Adrian's, named in honor of his deceased wife, and asks Rocky to become his trainer. Rocky is reluctant to return to boxing, having already made a one-off comeback at a very advanced age despite having suffered brain trauma during his career as a fighter. However, he eventually agrees. Donnie asks him about the "secret third fight" between him and Apollo just after Apollo helped Rocky regain the heavyweight title, and Rocky reveals that Apollo won. Donnie trains at the Front Street Gym, with several of Rocky's longtime friends as cornermen. He also finds a love interest in Bianca, an up-and-coming singer and songwriter in the early stages of progressive hearing loss.

Donnie, fighting under his biological mother's surname, Johnson, and the fight name "Hollywood", defeats local fighter Leo "The Lion" Sporino, which upsets the opposing corner. This leads to the opposing side leaking the news that Donnie is Creed's illegitimate son. Rocky receives a call from the handlers of world light heavyweight champion "Pretty" Ricky Conlan, who is being forced into retirement by an impending prison term. He offers to make Donnie his final challenger—provided that he fights using his father's surname, Creed. Donnie is hesitant at first, wanting to forge his own legacy. However, he eventually agrees with a little convincing from Bianca.

While helping Donnie train, Rocky stumbles, falls and is rushed to the hospital. Through further testing, he is diagnosed with non-Hodgkin's lymphoma. He is unwilling to undergo chemotherapy, citing its inability to save Adrian when she had ovarian cancer. Donnie later finds out and urges him to seek treatment. His diagnosis and the fact that his best friend and brother-in-law Paulie Pennino—Adrian's brother—has now died along with Apollo, and his old trainer, Mickey Goldmill, consign him to accept his eventual death, without treatment. Donnie confronts Rocky again and refuses to train for his fight with Conlan if Rocky doesn't accept treatment, which Rocky finally agrees to.

Donnie fights Conlan at Goodison Park in Conlan's hometown of Liverpool, and many parallels emerge between the bout that ensues and Apollo and Rocky's first fight forty years earlier. First, before entering the ring, Donnie receives a present from Mary Anne — new American flag trunks similar to the ones Apollo and later Rocky wore. Additionally, to the surprise of nearly everyone, Donnie gives Conlan all he can handle. Conlan knocks Donnie down, but Donnie recovers to knock Conlan down for the first time in his career. Donnie goes the distance, but Conlan wins on a split decision, and Donnie has won the respect of Conlan and the crowd. As Max Kellerman puts it while calling the fight for HBO, "Ricky Conlan won the fight, but Adonis Creed won the night." Conlan tells Donnie that he is the future of the light heavyweight division.

The film ends with Donnie and a frail but improving Rocky climbing the 72 steps outside the entrance of the Philadelphia Museum of Art.

Cast

 Michael B. Jordan as Adonis "Donnie" Creed (born Johnson): An underdog but talented light heavyweight boxer and the son of world heavyweight champion Apollo Creed.
 Alex Henderson as young Adonis "Donnie" Johnson
 Sylvester Stallone as Robert "Rocky" Balboa: A two-time world heavyweight champion and Apollo's rival-turned-friend who becomes Donnie's trainer and mentor. He owns and operates an Italian restaurant in Philadelphia named after his deceased wife Adrian (played by Talia Shire in previous films).
 Tessa Thompson as Bianca: A singer-songwriter with a hearing impairment who becomes Donnie's love interest.
 Phylicia Rashad as Mary Anne Creed: Apollo's widow and Donnie's stepmother, who takes in Donnie as a child following the death of Donnie's biological mother.
 Tony Bellew as "Pretty" Ricky Conlan: A highly formidable yet arrogant British boxer and the world light heavyweight champion.
 Graham McTavish as Tommy Holiday: Conlan's trainer.
 Wood Harris as Tony "Little Duke" Evers: One of Danny Wheeler's assistant trainers, the son of Apollo's, then Rocky's, trainer, Tony "Duke" Evers
 Ritchie Coster as Pete Sporino
 Tone Trump as himself
 Brian Anthony Wilson as James

A number of figures (real-life fighters and trainers) from boxing play in the film:
 Andre Ward as Danny "Stuntman" Wheeler: A light heavyweight boxer.
 Gabriel Rosado as Leo "The Lion" Sporino: A light heavyweight boxer.
 Jacob "Stitch" Duran as himself: An esteemed cutman in boxing, he previously portrayed the cutman of Mason "The Line" Dixon in Rocky Balboa.
Liev Schreiber voices an HBO 24/7 announcer, while Michael Buffer cameos as himself serving as ring announcer. Other sports media personalities who appear include ESPN's Tony Kornheiser, Michael Wilbon, Hannah Storm, and Max Kellerman, and HBO Sports' boxing announcer Jim Lampley.

Archive footage of Carl Weathers' Apollo Creed is used throughout the film.

Production

Development and writing

On July 24, 2013, it was announced that Metro-Goldwyn-Mayer had signed on with Fruitvale Station (2013) director Ryan Coogler to direct a spin-off of Rocky (1976), a seventh film in the Rocky series, which Coogler would also co-write with Aaron Covington. Sylvester Stallone also worked on the screenplay for the seventh film. The film would focus on a man following in the footsteps of his late father, Apollo Creed, and getting a mentor in the now-retired Rocky Balboa. Michael B. Jordan was set for the role of Creed's son, Adonis "Donnie" Creed, and Stallone was set to reprise his character of Rocky. Original producers Irwin Winkler and Robert Chartoff would produce, along with Stallone and Kevin King-Templeton. On April 25, 2014, while talking to The Hollywood Reporter, Coogler stated that he had sent his latest draft to the studio, and confirmed the involvement of Jordan and Stallone.
In an interview with Ellen, Sylvester Stallone reasoned why he refused to write Creed. He referred to a generational gap between the time when he wrote Rocky and the time when a film such as Creed would be making its appearance on the silver screen.

Pre-production
On November 10, real-life boxers Tony Bellew and Andre Ward joined the film, with Bellew to play a fighter, "Pretty" Ricky Conlan, the main opponent for Creed. Shooting was set to begin in January 2015, in Las Vegas and Philadelphia. On December 16, Tessa Thompson was added to the cast as the female lead. On January 8, 2015, Phylicia Rashad reportedly joined the film to play Mary Anne Creed, Apollo's widow. Sylvia Meals, who portrayed Mrs. Creed in Rocky II (1979) and Rocky IV (1985) had died in 2011. On January 21, Graham McTavish tweeted about his involvement in the film.

Filming
Principal photography began on January 19, 2015 on location at Goodison Park, with the first scene shot taking place during a Barclays Premier League football match between Everton (of which Stallone and native Evertonian Bellew are fans) and West Bromwich Albion. Goodison would later host both the climactic film fight between Donnie and Conlan and also Bellew's real-life title fight against Ilunga Makabu in May 2016, which was the first outdoor boxing match in Liverpool since 1949.

Filming also took place in Philadelphia. In early February, an empty store in Philadelphia was converted into a boxing gym, where some training scenes were shot.

On February 13, the crew was spotted filming in the Victor Cafe in South Philadelphia. The cafe was transformed into the "Adrian's Restaurant", and crew were again spotted filming there on February 16. Stallone and Jordan were also spotted on the set of the film on February 18. From February 24–27 and then on March 3, filming took place at Sun Center Studios in Aston Township.

Music

Soundtrack

The musical score for Creed was written by Swedish composer Ludwig Göransson, who is only the third composer in the history of the Rocky series, following Bill Conti (Rocky, II, III, V, and Balboa) and Vince DiCola (Rocky IV). Creed also features a soundtrack that consists mostly of music new to the series, including hip hop tracks by artists such as Future, Meek Mill, and White Dave. Both a score and a soundtrack album were released on November 20, 2015 by WaterTower Music and Atlantic Records, respectively. One tribute to Conti's original soundtrack is included – the track "You're a Creed" uses both "Gonna Fly Now" and "Going the Distance".

Release

Theatrical
On February 3, 2015, Warner Bros. slated the film to be released domestically on November 25, 2015. This date coincides with the 40th anniversary of the opening scene in the original film, where Rocky fights Spider Rico.

Piracy
On December 20, 2015, screeners of numerous prospective awards contenders, including Creed, were uploaded to torrent sites. The FBI has linked the case to co-CEO Andrew Kosove of Alcon Entertainment. Kosove claimed that he had "never seen this DVD", and that "it never touched his hands".

Reception

Box office
Creed grossed $109.8 million in North America and $63.8 million in other territories for a worldwide total of $173.6 million, against a budget of $35 million. In North America, Creed opened on Wednesday, November 25, 2015, alongside The Good Dinosaur and Victor Frankenstein, as well as the expanding wide releases of Brooklyn, Spotlight and Trumbo. The film ended up grossing $42.6 million in its first five days, including $30.1 million in its opening weekend, finishing third at the box office.

Critical response
The Los Angeles Times reported that the film received "early critical raves". On review aggregator website Rotten Tomatoes, the film holds an approval rating of 95% based on 312 reviews, with an average rating of 7.9/10. The website's critical consensus reads, "Creed brings the Rocky franchise off the mat for a surprisingly effective seventh round that extends the boxer's saga in interesting new directions while staying true to its classic predecessors' roots." On Metacritic, the film has a weighted average score of 82 out of 100, based on 42 critics, indicating "universal acclaim". Audiences polled by CinemaScore gave the film an average grade of "A" on an A+ to F scale, while PostTrak reported filmgoers gave it an overall positive score of 85%.

A.V. Wires Herman Dhaliwal gave the film a very positive review, writing, "I will say the film was everything I could have ever wanted and then some. It's a film that could have gone so wrong in so many ways so easily, but the results show something that is genuine and inspired. It takes the smartest possible routes with the story it wants to tell and delivers in basically every way it needed to. Ryan Coogler cements himself as one of the best rising filmmakers working today, as he crafts an emotional, funny, compelling and uplifting film that is full of strong performances." Andrew Barker of Variety stated that the film lives up to the expectation of its predecessors, while forging its own unique path. He also appreciated the performances of Stallone and Jordan, saying that Stallone deserved credit for taking a chance on young director Coogler, and that his trust had paid off. He concluded that the director "offered a smart, kinetic, exhilaratingly well-crafted piece of mainstream filmmaking". IGN reviewer John Lasser gave the film an 8.5 out of 10, saying, "Creed is a mirror of Rocky's story and we have all been watching that unfold on the big screen for decades. Coogler's film does nothing to break the mold. Rather, it shows that the mold exists for a reason. Jordan delivers a knockout performance, and Stallone does as well. In the end, we can all only hope that we'll get to see Adonis on screen for just as long as we've seen Rocky."

The screenplay was ranked the 22nd best American screenplay of the 21st century in IndieWire, with Zack Sharf writing, "Not only does the script manage to tell an authentic origin story of the young and determined Adonis Creed, but it also finds an authentic way to revive Sylvester Stallone's Rocky and make him the emotional lynchpin of Adonis' rise to champion boxer."

Accolades

Other media

Sequels

In January 2016, Sylvester Stallone and MGM CEO Gary Barber confirmed that a sequel to Creed was in development. That same month, Stallone posed the possibility of seeing Milo Ventimiglia appear in the sequel, reprising his role as Rocky's son Robert Balboa from Rocky Balboa. Ventimiglia previously revealed during the development of Creed that he was open to returning to the franchise, stating, "I'll tell you what, if they invited me, I'd love to be there. If they didn't, I wouldn't be offended."

Also that month, it was reported that the sequel's release was tentatively set for November 2017, although it was later pushed back to an unconfirmed date. Development was seemingly delayed by the announcement Coogler had cast Michael B. Jordan in his next film, Marvel's Black Panther, thus delaying production until both men's schedules permitted.

A confrontation between Adonis "Donnie" Creed and Ivan Drago was hinted at on Instagram. Stallone later confirmed that he had finished writing the script for the sequel, which would see Dolph Lundgren reprising his role as Ivan Drago from Rocky IV. By October 2017, Stallone stated on his social media page that he would direct the film, however, by December of the same year, Steven Caple Jr. was announced as the director of Creed II. Boxer Florian Munteanu was cast as Drago's son. In an interview on The Ellen DeGeneres Show, Jordan confirmed that Creed II was his next project.

The film was released in 2018.

A sequel, Creed III, directed by Jordan in his directorial debut, was released on March 3, 2023.

Video game
Creed: Rise to Glory – Released in 2018

Notes

References

External links

 
 
 
 
 
 
 

2015 films
2010s coming-of-age drama films
2010s sports drama films
American coming-of-age drama films
American sequel films
American sports drama films
African-American drama films
2010s English-language films
African-American films
Film spin-offs
Films about cancer
Films about old age
Films about orphans
Films directed by Ryan Coogler
Films featuring a Best Supporting Actor Golden Globe winning performance
Films produced by Irwin Winkler
Films scored by Ludwig Göransson
Films set in 1998
Films set in 2015
Films set in Liverpool
Films set in Los Angeles
Films set in Philadelphia
Films set in Tijuana
Films shot in London
Films shot in Liverpool
Films shot in Philadelphia
Metro-Goldwyn-Mayer films
New Line Cinema films
Warner Bros. films
Rocky (film series) films
2015 drama films
2010s American films